Max Lynch (born 12 September 1998) is a professional Australian rules footballer who plays for the Hawthorn Football Club in the Australian Football League (AFL), having been initially drafted to the Collingwood Football Club.

Early football
Lynch played junior football for the Jindera Bulldogs.  Lynch also played football for the Albury Football Club. Lynch played football for the Murray Bushrangers in the NAB League. He was selected as part of the 2016 Allies Squad in the AFL Under 18 Championships.

AFL career 
Lynch was selected at pick 51 of the 2017 AFL rookie draft from the Murray Bushrangers to Collingwood.

Lynch played the opening game of the 2022 season, unfortunately he was concussed during the second quarter and had to be replaced.

Statistics
Updated to the end of the 2022 season.

|-
| 2017 ||  || 45
| 0 || — || — || — || — || — || — || — || — || — || — || — || — || — || — || — || — || 0
|- 
| 2018 ||  || 45
| 0 || — || — || — || — || — || — || — || — || — || — || — || — || — || — || — || — || 0
|-
| 2019 ||  || 45
| 0 || — || — || — || — || — || — || — || — || — || — || — || — || — || — || — || — || 0
|-
| 2020 ||  || 45
| 1 || 0 || 0 || 1 || 1 || 2 || 0 || 5 || 2 || 0.0 || 0.0 || 1.0 || 1.0 || 2.0 || 0.0 || 5.0 || 2.0 || 0
|-
| 2021 ||  || 15
| 2 || 0 || 0 || 9 || 14 || 23 || 4 || 5 || 41 || 0.0 || 0.0 || 4.5 || 7.0 || 11.5 || 2.0 || 2.5 || 20.5 || 0
|-
| 2022 ||  || 18
| 7 || 4 || 1 || 37 || 25 || 62 || 14 || 11 || 123 || 0.6 || 0.1 || 5.3 || 3.6 || 8.9 || 2.0 || 1.6 || 17.6 || 0
|- class="sortbottom"
! colspan=3| Career
! 10 !! 4 !! 1 !! 47 !! 40 !! 87 !! 18 !! 21 !! 166 !! 0.4 !! 0.1 !! 4.7 !! 4.0 !! 8.7 !! 1.8 !! 2.1 !! 16.6 !! 0
|}

Notes

References

External links 

 
 
 

Living people
1998 births
Collingwood Football Club players
Hawthorn Football Club players
Australian rules footballers from New South Wales